USS McAnn (DE-179) is a retired  built for the United States Navy during World War II. She served in the Atlantic Ocean and provided escort service against submarine and air attack for Navy vessels and convoys. She was transferred to the Brazilian Navy in 1944 and renamed as Comandante Bauru.  She is now a museum ship preserved at the Brazilian Navy Cultural Center in Rio de Janeiro.

Namesake
Donald Roy McAnn was born on 23 June 1911 in Rochester, New York. He enlisted in the United States Navy on 16 August 1932. On 26 October 1942 U.S. carrier task forces fought a numerically superior Japanese force in the Battle of Santa Cruz Islands. During the air battle, he took valuable photographs from an exposed position on the forward port .50 caliber gun mount. In addition he rendered assistance to the gun crew and displayed outstanding courage without regard for his own safety. While relieving one of the gunners, he was struck by an exploding bomb fragment and fatally wounded. He was buried at sea. He was posthumously awarded the Navy Cross.

Construction and commissioning
The ship was laid down by Federal Shipbuilding and Drydock Co., Newark, New Jersey, on 17 May 1943; launched on 5 September 1943; sponsored by Mrs. Ethel Marie McAnn; and commissioned at New York on 11 October 1943.

World War II Atlantic Ocean operations

After shakedown off Bermuda, McAnn operated along the east coast from Newport, Rhode Island, to Charleston, South Carolina, until 19 December 1943 when she departed Norfolk, Virginia, on a convoy escort run to the Panama Canal Zone. She reached Coco Solo on 26 December, thence sailed the 31st for duty out of Key West, Florida. Arriving there on 3 January 1944, she for the next several weeks with the Fleet Sound School and trained sailors in anti-submarine warfare techniques.

Assigned to Escort Division 24, McAnn sailed for the Caribbean on 29 February. Steaming via Trinidad, she joined Convoy TJ-25 on 5 March and screened the ships through stormy seas en route to Recife, Brazil. On the 15th she rescued the entire crew of 10 men from a B-17 Flying Fortress which had splashed off the Brazilian coast the day before. McAnn arrived Recife on 16 March.

Between 2 and 12 April McAnn cruised to Trinidad in the screen of Convoy JT-27, and during the next three months she completed three additional escort runs between the Caribbean and Brazil. She cruised the South Atlantic in search of German submarines until returning to Recife on 30 July.

Transfer and Brazilian service 

McAnn underwent an upkeep and then steamed to Natal, Brazil, arriving on 10 August 1944. She decommissioned there on 15 August and was transferred, under lend lease, to Brazil on the same date. She was commissioned in the Brazilian Navy on 16 August as Bauru. She served on loan with Brazilian Navy until 30 June 1953 when she was retransferred to Brazil, permanently, under the Mutual Defense Assistance Pact.

References

External links

 
 NGB – Contratorpedeiro de Escolta/Aviso Oceânico Bauru – Be 4/U-28/D-18 

Cannon-class destroyer escorts of the United States Navy
Ships built in Kearny, New Jersey
1943 ships
World War II frigates and destroyer escorts of the United States
Bertioga-class destroyer escorts
Cannon-class destroyer escorts of the Brazilian Navy
World War II frigates of Brazil
Destroyer escort Bauru (D-18)
Museums in Rio de Janeiro (city)